Giant Markets, also known as Giant Food Markets, was a supermarket chain based in Binghamton, New York. Founded in 1933 by Metrie and George Akel, it was the first self-service supermarket in New York. The company eventually employed over 1,000 employees and operated twelve supermarkets in the Greater Binghamton area. Giant sold their franchise to Weis Markets in August 2009.

Buy out
On Thursday, May 21, 2009, Giant Markets was bought by Weis Markets. According to notices received by Giant associates, as of August 23, 2009 their employment ended at Giant Markets, and most of the 1,100 employees were expected to have jobs at Weis. However, many workers were laid off by Weis Markets.

On Wednesday, August 12, 2009, Giant Markets announced that it was closing its store at 56 Main Street in Binghamton effective Saturday, August 15 at 6:00pm, one week prior to the takeover date. All associates at that store were transferred to other Giant Markets locations. The store closure is a decision made by Weis Markets as part of the buyout.

Giant Markets formerly in Binghamton, NY,  and the successor Weis Markets in New York, is separate from the larger Giant Food Stores LLC supermarket chain, based in Carlisle, Pennsylvania, that is a subsidiary of European grocery conglomerate Ahold.

References

External links
Giant Food Markets of Broome County, New York

Retail companies established in 1933
Retail companies disestablished in 2009
Defunct supermarkets of the United States
Companies based in New York (state)
Binghamton, New York
Companies based in Binghamton, New York